Tanja is a locality in the Bega Valley Shire of New South Wales, Australia.

Tanja Public School is situated on Barrabooka Road. The school had an enrolment of 17 in 2017. It dates from 1878, having originally begun in a room of the school teacher's own residence.

Tanja Post Office opened on 1 September 1878 and closed on 28 August 1980.

Heritage listings
Tanja has a number of heritage-listed sites, including:
 Haighs Road  (within Mimosa Rocks National Park): Penders
 Nelson Lake Road, Nelson Lagoon, Mimosa Rocks National Park: Baronda

References

Localities in New South Wales
Bega Valley Shire